Hans Colbjørnsen (c.1675 – 1754) was a Norwegian timber merchant and military officer.

Colbjørnsen was born at the Sørum vicarage at Romerike in Akershus, Norway. He was the son of parish priest Colbjørn Torstensen Arneberg (1628-1720) and Catharina Kjeldsdatter Stub (1653-1731). He was a brother of Peder Colbjørnsen, and half brother of Anna Colbjørnsdatter. Colbjørnsen was among the wealthiest persons in Fredrikshald. He established himself as a trader in the early 1700s, where his uncle  Niels Kjeldsen Stub (1638-1721)  already had significant lands. Colbjørnsen entered a partnership with his brother Peder Colbjørnsen  in the timber trade.

Both he and his brother are known for the defense of Fredrikshald during the Great Northern War.  Peder Colbjørnsen was chief of the civilian resistance of Fredrikshald at the battles in 1716 and 1718.  Colbjørnsen was appointed to Lieutenant Colonel of infantry  by  King Christian VI of Denmark in 1733. In 1749, he was promoted to Colonel of King Frederick V of Denmark.

References

1675 births
1754 deaths
People from Sørum
Military personnel of the Great Northern War
People of the Great Northern War
18th-century Norwegian businesspeople
Norwegian businesspeople in timber
18th-century military personnel